Zealong is a New Zealand tea company based in Hamilton, New Zealand, where local climate, terroir, and lack of heavy frost aid in growing the camellia sinensis tea plant which  encouraged initial propagation trials in 1996. Zealong was the first commercial tea plantation in New Zealand, specialising in high-quality loose teas, green, oolong, and black tea, and are organic or conversion organic certified, Halal certified, and ISO 22000 / HACCP certified.

In January 2010, the company opened a restaurant on the estate, Camellia Tea House. The same year, Zealong gift boxes were voted world's best packaging by "The Dieline", the world's #1 package design website.

A successful export company and a Waikato icon cited for its innovative approach, ambition and support to local economy, Zealong has triggered overseas medias' curiosity, particularly in China and Taiwan, where this type of tea historically originates from. A popular New Zealand investigation programme Campbell live showcased Zealong in 2009 and case-studied the company as part of their subject on counterfeit products and the historical drought that hit the country in 2013. In September 2016, Zealong signed an export agreement with German tea retailer TeeGschwendner.

References

External links 
 

Tea brands
Tea companies
Companies based in Hamilton, New Zealand
Food and drink companies established in 1996
Food and drink companies of New Zealand
New Zealand brands